Sergei Yakovenko (born 24 March 1976 in Karaganda) is a Kazakhstani professional ice hockey player currently playing for Arystan Temirtau in the Kazakhstan Hockey Championship league. He previously played for Sary Arka Karaganda and was a member of the Kazakhstan men's national ice hockey team at the 2012 IIHF World Championship.

Career statistics

References

Kazakhstani ice hockey defencemen
Arystan Temirtau players
Sportspeople from Karaganda
1976 births
Living people
Asian Games silver medalists for Kazakhstan
Medalists at the 2007 Asian Winter Games
Ice hockey players at the 2007 Asian Winter Games
Asian Games medalists in ice hockey